Urgleptes querci is a species of beetle in the family Cerambycidae. It was described by Asa Fitch in 1858.

References

Urgleptes
Beetles described in 1858